Moolapalayam is a small village in Namakkal district, Tamil Nadu, India. It is located 17 km from Namakkal and 15 km from Tiruchengode. People and culture are completely traditional here.

Occupation 
The primary occupation of the people is agriculture, including the cultivation of rice, cotton, chilli, onion, vegetables, groundnuts, millet and grains. Various kinds of animal are raised for food, for trade or as pets.

Transport 
Buses are available from Manickampalayam, Most school buses service is available to this village.

Places to visit 
One of the important places in Moolapalayam is "The Hill of White" formally Vellakkaradu. It is an important ecosystem. Animal hunting and rock collecting are strictly prohibited by the government.

See also 
 Bharath Polytechnic College
 Government nursery school, Moolappalayam
 Two Mariyamman temples

Villages in Namakkal district